Leproplaca is a genus of lichen-forming fungi in the family Teloschistaceae. Its exhibits a leprose growth form, where the thallus consists primarily of asexual propagules called soredia.

Species
Leproplaca chrysodeta 
Leproplaca cirrochroa 
Leproplaca obliterans 
Leproplaca proteus 
Leproplaca xantholyta

References

Teloschistales
Teloschistales genera
Lichen genera
Taxa described in 1883
Taxa named by William Nylander (botanist)